Susie Power may refer to:
 Susie Power-Reeves, Australian runner
 Susie Power (actress), Irish actress and singer